Catopta dusii is a moth in the family Cossidae. It was described by Yakovlev, Saldaitis, Kons and Borth in 2013. It is found in China (Sichuan), where it has been recorded at altitudes ranging from 1,150 to 3,000 meters. The habitat consists of mountainous areas.

The wingspan is 47–50 mm for males and 39 mm for females. The ground colour of the forewings is dark-grey with a lighter pattern in the discal and
postdiscal areas. The hindwings are uniform dark-grey with light-grey marginal border. Adults have been recorded on wing from mid-July to early August.

Etymology
The species is named for Professor Stefano Dusi.

References

External Links 
Natural History Museum Lepidoptera generic names catalog

	

Moths described in 2013
Catoptinae